The president of Montenegro is the head of state of Montenegro. The current president is Milo Đukanović, who was elected in the first round of the 2018 presidential election with 53.90% of the vote. The official residence of the president is the Blue Palace in Cetinje.

Term
According to the Constitution of Montenegro, Article 97:

The President of Montenegro shall be elected for the period of five years.

The same person may be elected the President of Montenegro in two terms.

The President of Montenegro shall assume the duty on the date of taking an oath before the Members of the Parliament.

If the mandate of the President expires during the state of war or the state of emergency, the mandate shall be extended for maximum 90 days after the end of circumstances that have caused that state.

The President of Montenegro shall not perform any other public duty.

Duties

According to the Constitution of Montenegro, Article 95, the president of Montenegro:

 Represents Montenegro in the country and abroad;
 Commands over the Army on the basis of the decisions of the Defense and Security Council;
 Proclaims laws by Ordinance;
 Calls for the elections for the Parliament;
 Proposes to the Parliament: candidate for the prime minister, after consultations with the representatives of the political parties represented in the Parliament; president and judges of the Constitutional Court; protector of human rights and liberties;
 Appoints and revokes ambassadors and heads of other diplomatic missions of Montenegro abroad, at the proposal of the Government and after obtaining the opinion of the Parliamentary Committee responsible for international relations;
 Accepts letters of accreditation and revocation of the foreign diplomats;
 Awards medals and honors of Montenegro;
 Grants amnesty;
 Performs other tasks stipulated by the Constitution or the law.

Performance
According to the Constitution of Montenegro, Article 99, in the case of cessation of mandate of the president of Montenegro, until the election of the new president, as well as in the case of temporary impediment of the president to discharge his/her duties, the President of the Parliament of Montenegro shall discharge this duty.

Promulgation of laws
According to the Constitution of Montenegro, Article 94, the president of Montenegro shall proclaim the law within seven days from the day of adoption of the law, that is, within three days if the law has been adopted under a speedy procedure or send the law back to the Parliament for new decision-making process. The President of Montenegro shall proclaim the re-adopted law.

List

Latest elections

Standards

See also

 List of presidents of Montenegro
 Politics of Montenegro
 Prime Minister of Montenegro

References

External links
President of Montenegro

 
Montenegro
1990 establishments in Montenegro
Government of Montenegro
Politics of Montenegro